The 2011 Vivendi Seve Trophy, formerly known as the Seve Trophy, was played 15–18 September at Golf de Saint-Nom-la-Bretèche in France. The team captain for Great Britain and Ireland was Paul McGinley, with the captain for Continental Europe being Jean van de Velde. Great Britain and Ireland won the Trophy for the sixth consecutive time.

Format
The teams competed over four days with five fourball matches on both Thursday and Friday, four greensomes matches on Saturday morning, four foursomes matches on Saturday afternoon and ten singles matches on Sunday. It means a total of 28 points are available with 14½ points required for victory. If the score finished at 14–14, then two players from each team to play using the greensomes format to find the winner.

The prize money remained the same as for the 2009 event. Each member of the winner team received €65,000, the losing team €55,000 each, giving a total prize fund of €1,150,000.

Teams
The teams were made up of five leading players from the Official World Golf Rankings as of 5 September 2011 and five leading players (not otherwise qualified) from the Race to Dubai at the conclusion of the Omega European Masters (5 September 2011). There were a number of players (listed after each table below) who qualified for the trophy, but pulled out.

Raphaël Jacquelin was a late replacement for Álvaro Quirós who withdrew from the Continental Europe team with a wrist injury. Quirós had qualified as one of the leading 5 players in the World Rankings (world ranked 33). After his withdrawal his place amongst the World Rankings qualifiers was taken by Miguel Ángel Jiménez who had previously qualified through the Race to Dubai list. Jiménez's place in the Race to Dubai list was taken by Jacquelin.

The following players qualified but did not play: Luke Donald, Rory McIlroy, Graeme McDowell, Paul Casey, Justin Rose. Donald and Rose were playing in the BMW Championship.

Apart from Quirós, the following players qualified but did not play: Martin Kaymer, Robert Karlsson, Sergio García. Karlsson and García were playing in the BMW Championship.

Day one
Thursday, 15 September 2011

Fourball

Source:

Day two
Friday, 16 September 2011

Fourball

Source:

Day three
Saturday, 17 September 2011

Morning greensomes

Source:

Afternoon foursomes

Source:

Day four
Sunday, 18 September 2011

Singles

Source:

References

External links
Coverage on European Tour's official site
Vivendi Seve Trophy site

Seve Trophy
Golf tournaments in France
Vivendi Trophy
Vivendi Trophy
Vivendi Trophy